Mary-Anne Williams FTSE is the Michael J Crouch Chair for Innovation at the University of New South Wales in Sydney Australia (UNSW) based in the UNSW Business School.

She is founder and director of the UNSW Business AI Lab
and deputy director of the UNSW AI Institute.

Previously Mary-Anne was a Distinguished Research Professor at University of Technology Sydney and Director of the UTS Magic Lab. At UNSW Professor Williams works with staff, students, alumni and the broader innovation community to grow innovation and entrepreneurship across the University and accelerate innovative thinking in Australia.

Professor Williams is a Data Scientist and Behavioural Designer with expertise in Artificial Intelligence, Cognitive Science, Disruptive Technologies, Digital Transformation, Business and Law. She is listed among Robohub's "Top 25 Women in Robotics", and celebrated on the First International Day of Women and Girls in Science.

Professor Williams is a Fellow of AAAI (the peak global body for Artificial Intelligence), a Fellow of the Australian Academy of Technological Sciences and Engineering (ATSE), a Fellow of the Australian Computer Society (FACS), Fellow at CODEX at Stanford University. She has served on numerous boards and advisory groups including KR Inc, the Innovation Reference Group with the South Western Sydney Local Area Health District, the Digital Transformation and the AI Preparedness Committees at ATSE, the ACM Eugene L. Lawler Award for Humanitarian Contributions within Computer Science and Informatics.

Professor Williams has been a speaker at major events including the 2022 APAC Open Data Science Conference, 2021 ACM/IEEE International Conference on Human–Robot Interaction, 2020 Strategic Management Society Conference on Designing the Future at Berkeley, 2019 Academy of Marketing Science, United Nations WSIS Forum on the Impact of AI, 2016 World Science Festival, and Australian Strategic Policy Institute. She shared her views on the impact of AI on Human Rights during a panel at the  Australian Human Rights Commission Technology Conference.

Williams focuses on Innovation and works on AI, Decision Making Models, Human-AI Collaboration, and Law. She leads a partnership with the South Western Sydney Local Health District, the Softbank Social Robotics Partnership and the partnership with the Commonwealth Bank in Social Robotics. She discussed the impact of Artificial Intelligence on compassion and human rights with the Dalai Lama in Sydney in June 2018,.

Williams has a PhD in Computer Science and a Master of Laws. She is co-founder of the AI Policy Hub. From 2002–2020 Professor Williams led the UTS RoboCup Team to become World Champions in Social Robotics 2019–2022. The team was the Australian Champion and Top International team in 2004. It won the Human–Robot Interface Award in 2017. In 2018 the RoboCup Team won the Tour Guide Challenge with the highest score of any team on any test in the history of the Social Robotics League. In 2019 her Research Team won the Social Robotics League at RoboCup 2019. It was noted in 2020 that the team had more female representation that all the other teams in the Social Robotics league combined highlighting the breadth of her impact in robotics and her commitment to developing a new generation of leaders.

Williams is known for her foundational contributions to the field of Decision Making using insights, methods and techniques from belief revision. Belief Revision is a fundamental area in Artificial Intelligence. It provides representations, models and mechanisms for computers to develop a set of beliefs and to revise them over time as they receive new information. Belief revision plays a critical role in Explainable Artificial Intelligence. It allows AI systems to generate explanations of their behaviour that help humans interpret, understand, predict, and importantly trust AI systems.

Over the last three decades Professor Williams has provided solutions to several open research problems in decision making related to finite representations of beliefs, the iteration of belief revision mechanisms, and the relevance of changes and explanations. She developed the first computational models and anytime algorithms for Belief Revision Operators to be applied to real-world problems. Anytime algorithms have a critically important feature for real-world applications, the more time they have the better there outcomes. Not all algorithms have this feature. For example, venturing down fruitless decision/search tree branches usually means backtracking to a weaker outcome.

Publications
 "A Robot With Unlimited Patience Has Been Assisting Visitors At A Sydney Hospital This Week", March 2020
 "Making a Social Impact", March 2020
"The AI Race: Will Australia Lead or Lose, NSW Royal Society Journal, 2019"
 Robot Social Intelligence, International Conference on Social Robotics ICSR 2012: Social Robotics pp 45–55 Retrieved on 1 November 2017
 Decision-Theoretic Human–Robot Interaction: Designing Reasonable and Rational Robot Behaviour International Conference on Social Robotics
 ICSR 2016: Social Robotics pp 72–82 Retrieved 1 November 2017
 Technological Opacity, Predictability, and Self-Driving Cars "Cardozo Law Review, Vol. 38, 2016"
 "A social robot in a Shopping Center", December 2016
An investigation of parametrized difference revision operators', Annals of Mathematics and Artificial Intelligence 2019, with Theofanis Aravanis and Pavlos Peppas.
Full Characterization of Parikh's Relevance-Sensitive Axiom for Belief Revision, Journal of Artificial Intelligence Research 2019, with Theofanis Aravanis and Pavlos Peppas. 
Well-M³N: A Maximum-Margin Approach to Unsupervised Structured Prediction', IEEE Transactions on Emerging Topics in Computational Intelligence, 2019. with Abidi, S, Piccardi, M, Tsang, WH.
The Essence of Ethical Reasoning in Robot-Emotion Processing International Journal of Social Robotics 10 (2), 211-223, 2018 with Suman Ojha and Benjamin Johnston.
Evolving robot empathy towards humans with motor disabilities through artificial pain generations, Neuroscience 5 (1), 56-73, 2017 with Muh Anshar.
 "A social robot helping at check-in and at the gate, Sydney International Airport", August 2017
 " Field Work enabled by a unique Academic-Industry Partnership", August 2017

See also
 Innovation

References 

Academic staff of the University of Technology Sydney
Year of birth missing (living people)
Living people
Australian roboticists
Women roboticists
Fellows of the Australian Academy of Technological Sciences and Engineering